William (Bill) Tupper (born 7 October 1933) was a Progressive Conservative party member of the House of Commons of Canada. He was a businessman, geologist and professor of geology by career. He was the mayor of Rideau Township from 1974 to 1978.

He was elected at Nepean—Carleton electoral district in the 1984 federal election, thus he served in the 33rd Canadian Parliament. In the 1988 federal election, he ran in the Nepean riding but was defeated  by Beryl Gaffney of the Liberal party.

Electoral record

External links
 

1933 births
Living people
Members of the House of Commons of Canada from Ontario
Progressive Conservative Party of Canada MPs
Mayors of Rideau